Limosella is a genus of flowering plants known as mudworts. These are annual, largely aquatic plants, found in muddy areas worldwide. Its phylogeny and biogeography are inferred from molecular data

Selected species:
Limosella acaulis - Owyhee mudwort
Limosella aquatica - water mudwort
Limosella australis - Welsh mudwort
Limosella capensis
Limosella inflata
Limosella longiflora
Limosella major
Limosella pubiflora - Chiricahua Mountain mudwort

References

External links
Jepson Manual Treatment

Scrophulariaceae
Scrophulariaceae genera